Cleptophasia is a monotypic moth genus of the family Notodontidae described by Prout in 1918. It consists of only one species, Cleptophasia scissa, first described by Warren in 1909, which is found in Brazil, French Guiana and Venezuela.

References

Notodontidae of South America
Monotypic moth genera